Římov is a municipality and village in České Budějovice District in the South Bohemian Region of the Czech Republic. It has about 1,000 inhabitants.

Administrative parts
Villages of Branišovice, Dolní Stropnice, Dolní Vesce, Horní Vesce and Kladiny are administrative parts of Římov.

Geography
It lies in the Gratzen Foothills. It is located on the left bank of the Malše River.

On the Malše River just above the village there is the Římov Reservoir providing drinking water for large portion of South Bohemia. It has a volume of 33.8 million m³.

History
The first written mention of Římov dates from 1395. The village was founded probably in the 13th century and belonged to lower aristocratic families.

In 1626 Římov became property of Duke of Eggenberg, the owner of the castle in Český Krumlov. In the same year the duke gave Římov to the Jesuits and they established there a pilgrimage site with large Way of the Cross in 1648. The Way contains 25 stations and every year many people are starting their pilgrimage tradition right in Římov.

Gallery

References

External links

Pilgrimage site in Římov

Villages in České Budějovice District